Lake Gibson can refer to:
 Lake Gibson (Florida), a lake in Polk County
 Lake Gibson (Ontario), a reservoir in the Niagara Region

See also 

 Gibson Lake (disambiguation)
 Lake Gibson High School, Lakeland, Florida